KJOC may refer to:

KBOB (AM), a radio station (1170 kHz) licensed to Davenport, Iowa, United States, which held the KJOC callsign from 1993 to 2014
KJOC (FM), a radio station (93.5 MHz) licensed to Bettendorf, Iowa, United States